House of Newe may refer to:

Castle Newe, whose coach-house is known as 'House of Newe', Aberdeenshire
Newe House, Suffolk